Tandem Friends School is a coeducational secondary school founded in 1970 in Albemarle County, Virginia, just outside Charlottesville, by educators John Howard and Duncan Alling.  In 1995, it joined the Friends Council on Education, adopting the educational beliefs and practices of the Quakers. The current head of school is Whitney Thompson. The Upper School, grades 9-12, has approximately 130 students, while the Middle School, grades 5-8, has approximately 105 students. The head of the Upper School is Peter Gaines, and the head of the Middle School is Todd Love. The mascot is a badger and the original mascot was a tree.

History
Founded in 1970, Tandem is the first Friends School in the U.S. that started as a non-Quaker School. The school is accredited by the National Association of Independent Schools and the Virginia Association of Independent Schools and is a member of the Friends Council on Education.

Traditions
Longstanding Tandem traditions include Morning Meeting, Meeting for Worship, Spring Day, Blue Ridge Day, Speaker Series, Emphasis Week, Open Mic, Sophomore Seminars, and Senior Projects.

The Saturday before Mother's Day has been the date of the annual Mother's Day Music Festival, a small festival to honor mothers and to showcase local musicians. A notable past act to play on the quad at Tandem Friends School for the Mother's Day Music Festival was Dave Matthews.

Athletics
Tandem Friends School fields up to eighteen sports teams and maintains a no-cut policy. The school's JV and varsity teams compete in the Greater Piedmont Athletic Conference (GPAC). Middle School athletic teams compete with various other middle schools in the surrounding area.
The Varsity Girls' Soccer Team won the VISAA Division II State Championship in the Spring of 2010, and repeated in Spring of 2011 and Spring of 2012.

Arts Program
Tandem Friends School has an Arts program that encompasses visual arts, drama, and music. Drama and art are each taught for one semester each year in the Middle School grades. Art electives abound in the Upper School, as well as drama classes and an after-school drama program that presents a musical in the fall, a one-act play festival in the winter, and a comedy or drama in the spring.

5th through 7th graders take regular music classes. The school has a jazz band, Rock and Roll bands, as well as other music class offerings. Tandem sports two fully equipped music rooms, with guitars, basses, and a drum kit, as well as many other instruments for performing and recording.

References

External links
 Tandem Friends School

Private high schools in Virginia
Schools in Albemarle County, Virginia
Quaker schools in Virginia
Private middle schools in Virginia
1970 establishments in Virginia
Educational institutions established in 1970